Anuwat Nuchit  is a Thai football player who played for Thailand Premier League side Sisaket including the team's Thailand Premier League seasons.

References

1986 births
Living people
Anuwat Nuchit
Association football midfielders
Anuwat Nuchit